Sara Mérida Pérez (born 8 April 1993) is a retired Spanish football midfielder who last played for RCD Espanyol. Following a number of injuries, she retired from football and is currently the physiotherapist at Espanyol.

Playing career

She won the 2010 UEFA U-17 Championship and took part in the 2010 U-17 World Cup in which Spain won the bronze medal, scoring against New Zealand during the latter tournament. An anterior cruciate ligament injury in a game against Real Sociedad in January 2011 prevented her from playing in the 2011 UEFA U-19 Championship. She had surgery on 8 April, her 18th birthday. Eight months after her initial cruciate ligament injury, she injured her knee again during a training session. A third recurrence of the same injury then led to her being out of football for a total of over two years since the first occurrence of the injury. She was then forced to retire from football after the fourth injury.

Personal life and post-playing career

Her brother Fran is also a footballer. In 2016, following her retirement from football, she became a personal trainer with clients that include Sandra Paños, Kenti Robles and her brother Fran. She also holds a UEFA B Licence. Since 2018, she has been working as a physiotherapist for Espanyol Femení.

External links
Profile at RCD Espanyol

References

1993 births
Living people
Spanish women's footballers
Primera División (women) players
RCD Espanyol Femenino players
Footballers from Barcelona
Women's association football midfielders
RCD Espanyol non-playing staff
Association football physiotherapists
Spain women's youth international footballers